The Independence Centenary Games of Central America was a football tournament organized to celebrate 100 years of Central American Independence from Spain. The tournament was held between Costa Rica, El Salvador, Guatemala, and Honduras. It was hosted by Guatemala and occurred between 14 and 18 September 1921 in Guatemala City.

Participants 

Four of the original five members of the Federal Republic of Central America (1821–1841) participated in the tournament: Costa Rica, El Salvador, Guatemala, and Honduras. The tournament was the first time each nation played an international association football match.

Venue 

The three games of the tournament were all held in the Campo de Marte in Guatemala City, Guatemala.

Format 

The tournament was a single-elimination tournament. Matches were 80 minutes long.

Squads

Costa Rica squad

El Salvador squad

Guatemala squad

Honduras squad

Tournament

Bracket

Semifinals

Final

Goalscorers 

6 goals

  Rafael Ángel Madrigal

3 goals

  Claudio Arguedas Catchenguis
  Fernando Minondo

2 goals

  Constantino Kiehnle

1 goal

  Wenceslao Aldaz
  Ricardo Bermúdez Portuguez
  Julio Dougherty
  Mariano Enríquez
  Joaquín Manuel Gutiérrez Sedó
  Roberto Figueredo
  Jorge Luis Solera
  Rafael Villacorta

Overall rankings

See also 

Football at the Central American and Caribbean Games

References 

International association football competitions in Central America
1921 in association football
1921 in Guatemala
Sports competitions in Guatemala City
20th century in Guatemala City
Regional centennial anniversaries
September 1921 sports events